Chinquapin (also, Chincapin and Chinkapin) is a former settlement in Mariposa County, California. It is located within Yosemite National Park, adjacent to the community of Yosemite West. Chinquapin is the midway point between Yosemite Valley and Wawona, a community inside the park.

History

Chinquapin was built as a junction of the Old Glacier Point Road, which was built in 1882.  Previously it was a bridle trail to Glacier Point (the current Glacier Point Road, which starts immediately north of the old road was built in 1940). On an 1896 U.S. Cavalry map it is marked as "Chinquapin Station"

It was named Chinquapin after Chinquapin Creek, which is immediately northwest of Chinquapin. Chinquapin Creek is today called Indian Creek. Chinquapin Creek (and therefore Chinquipin) was named for the Sierra Chinquapin (Chrysolepis sempervirens) brush that grows in the area (with spiny seeds).

Chinquapin was the second ski area in Yosemite. This second ski area at Chinquapin was opened after the Wawona Tunnel was built (allowing Winter access). Before that, people skied on the glacial moraine in Yosemite Valley that is just east of the horse stables by the Pines Campgrounds. Later, the ski area moved from Chinquapin to Badger Pass on the Old Glacier Point Road. Today the ski area is in Simpson Meadow (below Badger Pass).

Chinquapin used to have a Gas Station up to the 1990s. Before that, the Gas Station was a small ski lodge (what some refer to as a "lunch room") that opened in 1933. The Gas Station was cleaned up as a toxic site by the park concessionaire (Delaware North) as a condition of their winning the Park concession in 1993 from the previous concessionaire (MCA Corporation).
As referenced in the Yosemite Environmental Education Center, Final EIS report, "The Chinquapin Developed Area Cultural Landscape encompasses not only the features of the Chinquapin Historic District, but also includes the whole intersection as well as an associated water tank located approximately 600 feet from the Comfort Station (Sandy and DuBarton; 2007). The period of significance for the Chinquapin Developed Area is 1933 to 1938, during which the buildings and landscape were designed and built. Proposed contributing features include: the Glacier Point Road and Wawona Road intersection, the Ranger Station (1934), Garage / Storage (1934), Comfort Station (1933), and Redwood Water Tank (1936). Of the contributing structures evaluated as part of the Glacier Road Rehabilitation Environmental Assessment (NPS; 2007), the redwood water tank (located along the Old Wawona Road), the double pipe culvert along Wawona Road, the water fountain in front of the Chinquapin Comfort Station, and the island in front of the Ranger Station contribute to the significance of the Chinquapin Developed Area as a cultural landscape."

Badger Pass and Chinquapin
The skiing history of this community has faded through the years, accelerated by the loss of the gas station and store.
Chinquapin today is a stopping point with new restroom facilities utilizing "State of the Art" fixtures as a testing ground for new waste water systems. This effort ties well to the addition of the new Yosemite Institute campus adjacent to Yosemite West. This new Campus, part of  NatureBridge, a Yosemite National Park non-profit partner, aims to promote visitor understanding, stewardship, and appreciation of diverse park environments.

During the winter months, Chinquapin is used as a tire-chain installation point before the ascent to Badger Pass Ski Area.  There are usually crews and rangers on hand during snowy periods to aid the visitor on proper installation of the chains on their vehicles. If weather conditions exceed the limits of safety or if Badger Pass ski area has no available parking spaces, rangers will close the gates to Glacier Point Road at the Chinquapin intersection to all ascending vehicles.

Trailheads near Chinquapin

The Deer Camp trailhead is just south of Chinquapin and Glacier Point Road. As you hike along the trail above Hwy 41, it passes over Rail Creek and Strawberry Creek on its way to Deer Camp on Empire Meadow. The trail's endpoint is at the town of Wawona.

The Old Glacier Point Trail begins at Chinquapin and is the only other trail in the vicinity of the site. It begins about 100 feet behind the bathroom facility, behind the old water tank in Chinquapin.  As the name suggests it is the former road and leads northeast. On several trail maps, this trail is marked #7 as seen on this link's page 2 example 

“This reconstruction of the bridle trail from Chinquapin to Glacier Point as a 16-foot wide wagon road, allowed vehicle access to Glacier Point. In 2000, it was found to eligible for the National Register of Historic Places under Criteria A, B and C by Nave (2000) as indicated in Sandy and DuBarton (2007). In addition, Nave recommended that the remaining intact portions of the Old Glacier Point Road be recorded and added and that the entire route be nominated as the Old Glacier Point Road Historic District.”

See also 
 Henness Ridge Fire Lookout
 Yosemite West
 Yosemite National Park
 Yosemite Valley
 Badger Pass Ski Area
 Mariposa County
 History of the Yosemite area

References

Former settlements in Mariposa County, California
Former populated places in California
Yosemite National Park